The 12577 / 12578 Bagmati Express is a weekly Superfast train from Darbhanga in Bihar to Mysore in Karnataka, a 3041 km long route and it is operated by Indian Railways–East Central Railway zone.

This train is named after the Bagmati River which originates in Nepal and flows through Darbhanga.

Overview

Bagmati Express is one of the most important train for the passengers of Bihar. It connects the Indian states of Bihar, Uttar Pradesh, Madhya Pradesh, Maharashtra, Telangana, Andhra Pradesh, Tamil Nadu, Karnataka.

Coach composition
The coach composition of the 12578 / 12579 train is:

 3 AC II Tier
 3 AC III Tier
 10 Sleeper coaches
 2 General Unreserved
 1 Pantry car
 2 End On Generator cars (EOG)

Route & Halts

Locomotive

 Darbhanga to MGR Chennai Central it is hauled by a Gomoh-based WAP-7 locomotive.
 MGR Chennai Central to Mysuru it is hauled by a Lallaguda or Royapuram-based WAP-7 locomotive.

See also
 Ganga Kaveri Express

References

External links

Transport in Mysore
Transport in Darbhanga
Named passenger trains of India
Rail transport in Bihar
Rail transport in Karnataka
Express trains in India
Rail transport in Madhya Pradesh
Rail transport in Uttar Pradesh
Rail transport in Maharashtra
Rail transport in Telangana
Railway services introduced in 2007
Rail transport in Andhra Pradesh
Rail transport in Tamil Nadu